The Col de la Croix de Chaubouret (elevation ) is a mountain pass in France, located in the Pilat massif in the Loire. It is between Graix and Le Bessat.

Details of the Climb
Starting from Bourg-Argental (south), the Col de la Croix de Chaubouret is 13.90 km long. Over this distance, the climb has an elevation gain of 656 m (an average of 4.72%). The steepest section is 8.5%.

Starting from Saint Chamond (north), the Col de la Croix de Chaubouret is 15.80 km long. Over this distance, the climb has an elevation gain of 839 m (an average of 5.31%). The steepest section is 7.8%.

Starting from Saint-Étienne (west), the Col de la Croix de Chaubouret is 16 km long. Over this distance, the climb has an elevation gain of 611 m (an average of 3.82%). The steepest section is 7.2%.

Tour de France
The climb has been used in the Tour de France eleven times. It was most recently used in 1999.

Appearances in the Tour de France

References

Landforms of Loire (department)
Mountain passes of the Massif Central
Mountain passes of Auvergne-Rhône-Alpes